The Trinidad spiny pocket mouse (Heteromys anomalus) is a species of rodent in the family Heteromyidae. It is found in Colombia, Trinidad and Tobago, and Venezuela.

References

Heteromys
Mammals of Colombia
Mammals of Trinidad and Tobago
Mammals of the Caribbean
Mammals of Venezuela
Mammals described in 1815
Taxonomy articles created by Polbot